Musicadium was a global digital music and video distribution service that operated between 2006 and mid-2010, based in Brisbane, Australia, until they were bought out by Valleyarm.

Musicadium delivered digital content of labels, artists, bands and other rights holders to digital retailers such as iTunes, Nokia Music Store, AmazonMP3 and eMusic. Musicadium also provided promotional, educational and information services to the music community, as well as live events, research papers,
 educational workshops and seminars  and speaking at and sponsoring industry events.

History and Overview
After initially taking 9% of its customer's sales royalties as per the traditional digital music distribution, Musicadium moved to a 100% royalties returned to the artist model in December 2007.  Musicadium artists retained all rights, copyright or masters to their music and the distribution deal is non-exclusive.

As of July 8, 2010, Musicadium announced that Musicadium's catalogue would be acquired by Valleyarm. Valleyarm will continue to provide artists and labels DIY digital distribution services, but also access to hundreds of new stores, publishing and sub-publishing avenues, and touring and marketing opportunities.

Notable Artists
Musicadium distributed many well-known artists such as:
Doug Anthony All Stars
Seth Sentry
Hungry Kids of Hungary
Scott Edgar and the Universe
Ted Egan
Gotye
Kisschasy
Clare Bowditch
Southern Sons
ARIAs Awards
Dragon (band)

References

External links

Musicadium Website

Internet properties established in 2006
Online music stores of Australia